Blue Weekend is the third studio album by English alternative rock band Wolf Alice, released on 4 June 2021 through Dirty Hit. Blue Weekend was preceded by four singles—"The Last Man on Earth", "Smile", "No Hard Feelings" and "How Can I Make It OK?". The album received acclaim from music critics, with many naming it the band's best work, and was shortlisted for the Mercury Prize in 2021.

Release
On 24 February 2021, Wolf Alice announced the album's title and initial release date of 11 June, alongside the release of lead single "The Last Man on Earth". On 3 May 2021, the band announced that they would be bringing the album's release earlier by one week, to 4 June.

Promotion

Singles
Blue Weekend was preceded by four singles. "The Last Man on Earth" was released on 24 February 2021 as the album's lead single. It was premiered by Annie Mac on her 
eponymous BBC Radio 1 Radio program, where Ellie Rowsell and Theo Ellis from the band co-hosted with her. The music video was released on YouTube an hour after Mac's radio show started.

"Smile" was released on 20 April 2021 as the album's second single. It was premiered the same way as its predecessor.

"No Hard Feelings" was released on 11 May 2021, an hour earlier than the previous two on Zane Lowe's Apple Music show, with the music video again released on YouTube an hour afterwards. "How Can I Make It OK?" was released on 3 June 2021 as the fourth and last single of the album along with a music video on YouTube.

Critical reception

Blue Weekend received acclaim from music critics, many of whom described it as their best album. On Metacritic, which assigns a normalized rating of 100, the album received an average score of 91, based on 19 reviews, indicating "universal acclaim". It was ranked as the third highest-rated album of 2021 on the website at the time of release.

Music publication The Forty-Five awarded the album 5/5 stars, calling Blue Weekend "a ballsy idyll of feeling: the sound of a band satisfying themselves rather than proving themselves, and completely filling the space they've carved out over the years."

Blue Weekend was nominated for the Mercury Prize in 2021, and multiple NME Awards in 2022.

Accolades

Commercial performance
Blue Weekend debuted at number one on the UK Albums Chart with 36,182 copies sold in its first week, becoming Wolf Alice's first number-one album. It was the biggest-selling album of 2021 in UK independent record shops.

Track listing

Personnel
Credits adapted from the liner notes of Blue Weekend.

Wolf Alice
 Ellie Rowsell – vocals, guitar, piano, bass, programming, Mellotron, synth, Wurlitzer, string arrangement
 Joff Oddie – guitar, piano, backing vocals, glock, programming, synth, claps, electric upright bass, bass, tenor resonator, 12-string, classical guitar, acoustic guitar
 Theo Ellis – bass, programming
 Joel Amey – drums, percussion, synth, backing vocals, guitar, Stylophone, programming, claps

Additional musicians
 Owen Pallett – string arrangement, violin, viola
 Iain Berryman – glasses, programming, keys, trumpet
 Joel Workman – electric upright bass
 Michael Peter Olsen – cello
 Markus Dravs – programming, synth

Technical
 Markus Dravs – production
 Iain Berryman – engineering, additional production
 Joel Workman – engineering assistance ; additional engineering 
 Charlie Andrew – vocal production ; additional vocal production ; additional vocal recording 
 Mark "Spike" Stent – mixing
 Matt Wolach – mixing assistance
 Ted Jensen – mastering

Artwork
 Jordan Hemingway – creative direction, photography
 Jamie Reid – art direction
 Aiden Miller – design

Charts

Weekly charts

Year-end charts

Certifications

Release history

References

External links
 

2021 albums
Wolf Alice albums
Albums produced by Markus Dravs
Dirty Hit albums
RCA Records albums